Asunción Arriola-Pérez (August 15, 1895 – 1967) was a Filipino government official.
She became a social worker for the Red Cross in 1924 and held such positions as Executive Secretary of the Associated Charities of Manila and the Red Cross. She and her husband were arrested and detained in Fort Santiago in 1944. Her husband was later executed by the Japanese. She was a former administrator of Social Welfare from 1948 to 1953. She was also one of the original board of trustees of the Philippine Rural Reconstruction Movement.
She founded the Children's Garden of the Philippines in 1954.

References

Women members of the Cabinet of the Philippines
Secretaries of Social Welfare and Development of the Philippines
Roxas administration cabinet members
Quirino administration cabinet members
1895 births
1967 deaths